The Transport Holding Company (THC) was a British Government-owned company created by the Transport Act 1962 to administer a range of state-owned transport, travel and engineering companies that were previously managed by the British Transport Commission (BTC). It came into existence on 1 September 1962, with certain assets of the BTC vested in it on 1 January 1963.

Assets 
The THC's assets were very varied, reflecting its role as the manager of those investments that did not fit elsewhere in the post-1962 structure of nationalised transport. There were essentially six areas of activity:

 bus companies, some part-owned with the British Electric Traction Group, later acquired by the THC,
 bus manufacturing companies (Bristol Commercial Vehicles and Eastern Coach Works)
 road haulage companies, e.g. British Road Services (BRS) and Pickfords
 shipping lines, e.g. the BTC's shares in Associated Humber Lines and the Atlantic Steam Navigation Company
 travel agents (Thomas Cook and Son, to which Lunn Poly was later added)
 miscellaneous (the BTC's shares in the Penarth Dock Engineering Company)

Demise

With the coming into effect of the Transport Act 1968 on 1 January 1969, the THC's road transport and shipping interests passed to the National Bus Company, the National Freight Corporation and the Scottish Transport Group. Its remaining assets were privatised and the company dissolved in the early 1970s.

Subsidiary companies

Bus companies – England and Wales 
The following companies passed to the THC in 1963:
Brighton Hove and District Omnibus Company
Bristol Omnibus Company
Crosville Motor Services
Cumberland Motor Services
Durham District Services
Eastern Counties Omnibus Company
Eastern National Omnibus Company
Hants & Dorset Motor Services
Lincolnshire Road Car
Mansfield District Traction
Midland General Omnibus Company
Notts & Derby
Red & White Services
Southern National Omnibus Company
Southern Vectis
South Midland
Thames Valley Traction
Tilling's Transport (THC) Limited
United Automobile Services
United Counties Omnibus Company
United Welsh Services Limited
West Yorkshire Road Car
Western National Omnibus Company
Wilts and Dorset Motor Services

The THC also had a shareholding in the following coach companies (the remaining shares were owned by British Electric Traction):
Black and White Motorways 
Samuelson Transport
A Timpson and Sons

In October 1967 the THC purchased one of the largest remaining independent bus operators:
West Riding Automobile Company and its 50% subsidiary:
County Motors (Lepton) Limited

In March 1968, as the Transport Act 1968 was passing through parliament, British Electric Traction decided to sell its bus operations to the THC:
Aldershot and District Traction
Devon General Omnibus and Touring Company and its subsidiary:
Grey Cars of Torquay
East Kent Road Car Company
East Midland Motor Services
East Yorkshire Motor Services
Greenslade's Tours
Hebble Motor Services
Maidstone & District
Mexborough and Swinton Traction
Midland Red and its subsidiary:
Stratford Blue
Neath and Cardiff Luxury Coaches
North Western Road Car
Northern General Transport and its subsidiaries:
Gateshead and District Omnibus Company
Sunderland District Omnibus Company
Tynemouth and District Transport
Tyneside Omnibus company
Wakefield's Motors Limited
City of Oxford Motor Services
Potteries Motor Traction
Rhondda Transport Company
Ribble Motor Services and its subsidiaries:
Standerwick
Scout
Sheffield United Tours
South Wales Transport
Southdown Motor Services
Trent Motor Traction
Western Welsh Omnibus Company
Thomas Bros (Port Talbot) Limited
Yorkshire Traction
Yorkshire Woollen District Transport

THC already had a minority shareholding in many of the BET companies through shares purchased by the mainline railway companies in 1929–1930, which had passed to the state on the nationalisation of British Railways.  The acquisition of the BET companies led to the THC gaining 100% of Black and White, County Motors, Samuelson's and Timpson's

Bus companies – Scotland 
The Scottish companies were known as the Scottish Bus Group:
 Central SMT
 Highland Omnibuses
 Scottish Omnibuses
 Walter Alexander and Sons (Fife) Limited
 Walter Alexander and Sons (Midland) Limited
 Walter Alexander and Sons (Northern) Limited
 Western SMT

Chairmen
 Sir Philip Warter
 Sir Reginald Wilson
 Lewis Whyte

Notes

References

Former nationalised industries of the United Kingdom
British Transport Commission
British companies established in 1962